In the Middle Ages, from the 11th century, the Cluniac order established a number of religious houses in the kingdoms of England and Scotland.

History
Traditionally the Rule of Saint Benedict was interpreted that each monastery should be independent of other houses; this made it problematic to achieve reform if discipline had slipped or to resist the pressure to become a part of the Feudal structure, with the office of Abbot becoming an office at the disposal of the local lord. The Cluniac reform, the first major attempt to offer an institutional response to these issues, was to subvert this by making all of the monks of the houses that were part of Cluny members of the Cluny Abbey, with the subordinate houses being Priories of the Abbey. Subsequent orders – such as the Carthusians – were wholly integrated as an order, and modern Benedictines are organised in families which offer mutual accountability, e.g. the English Benedictine Congregation and the Subiaco Cassinese Congregation. Within just a century after its foundation the priory of Monk Bretton  in Yorkshire ceased to be a Cluniac house, and remained Benedictine, pure and simple, till the Dissolution.

Those houses that were larger than cells were known as priories, symbolising their subordination to the Abbey of Cluny in Burgundy. The prior of St Pancras at Lewes usually held the position of vicar-general of the Abbot of Cluny for England and Scotland. Since the head of their order was the Abbot at Cluny, all members of the order in Britain were bound to cross to France to visit Cluny to consult or be consulted, unless the Abbot chose to come to Britain. This he did five times in the 13th century, and only twice in the 14th.

In 1056, the first Cluniac nunnery was founded at Marcigny and after this other convents followed including those in the British Isles. The Cluniac nuns were always greatly outnumbered by their male counterparts.

In England, the Cluniac houses numbered thirty-five at the time of Henry VIII's Dissolution of the Monasteries in the 16th century. At that time there were also three houses in the kingdom of Scotland.

List of priories

England
Arthington Priory, Yorkshire (nuns)
Barnstaple Priory, Devon
Bermondsey Abbey, London
Bromholm Priory, Norfolk
Castle Acre Priory, Norfolk
Daventry Priory, Northamptonshire
Delapré Abbey, Northampton (nuns)
Derby Cluniac Priory, Derby
Dudley Priory, Dudley, West Midlands
Faversham Abbey, Kent – autonomous Cluniac Abbey
Glastonbury Abbey, Somerset – autonomous Cluniac Abbey between 1120 and 1170 under Abbot Henry of Blois, Bishop of Winchester
Kerswell Priory, Devon
Lenton Priory, Nottingham
Lewes Priory, Sussex
Monk Bretton Priory, Yorkshire
Monkton Farleigh Priory, Wiltshire
Montacute Priory, Somerset
Pontefract Priory, Yorkshire
Prittlewell Priory, Essex
Reading Abbey, Berkshire – autonomous Cluniac Abbey
St Andrew's Priory, Northampton
St Mawgan Monastery, Cornwall
St Pancras Priory, Lewes, Sussex
Stansgate Priory, Essex
Tenbury Priory, Worcestershire
Thetford Priory, Norfolk
Tickford Priory, Buckinghamshire
Wangford Priory, Suffolk
Wenlock Priory, Shropshire

Scotland
Crossraguel Abbey, Ayrshire
Paisley Abbey, Renfrewshire
Renfrew Abbey, Renfrewshire

References

 
 
 
Order of Saint Benedict